Devid Eugene Bouah (born 13 August 2001) is an Italian professional footballer of Ivorian descent who plays as a defender for  club Reggina.

Club career
He was raised in the youth teams of Roma. He played for Roma in the 2017–18 and 2018–19 editions of the UEFA Youth League. He was called up to Roma's senior squad in February 2018, but remained on the bench. He made his debut for Roma on 20 July 2018 in a pre-season friendly against Avellino. In November 2018, he suffered an ACL tear which forced him to miss most of the 2018–19 season. In the first game of the 2019–20 Campionato Primavera 1, he suffered an ACL tear again, which made him miss the 2019–20 season as well.

On 2 October 2020, he joined Serie B club Cosenza on a season-long loan. He made his Serie B debut for Cosenza on 17 October 2020 in a game against Cittadella. He substituted Angelo Corsi in the 69th minute.

On 31 August 2021 he joined Teramo on loan.

On 1 September 2022, Bouah signed a multi-year contract with Reggina.

International career
He was first called up to represent Italy in October 2017 for the Under-17 Euro qualifiers. He was not selected for the final tournament squad or the squad for the 2019 UEFA European Under-19 Championship due to his injuries.

Personal life
Bouah was born to an Italian mother and an Ivorian father. He has a younger brother, Ethan (born 2005), who is a youth player for AS Roma.

References

External links
 

2001 births
Living people
Italian people of Ivorian descent
Italian sportspeople of African descent
Footballers from Rome
Italian footballers
Association football defenders
Serie B players
Serie C players
A.S. Roma players
Cosenza Calcio players
S.S. Teramo Calcio players
Reggina 1914 players
Italy youth international footballers